Maradana desertalis is a moth of the family Pyralidae described by George Hampson in 1908. It is found in Balochistan.

References

Moths described in 1908
Pyralini